Peter Schaap (born 24 October 1946 in Groningen) is a Dutch singer and writer.

Biography 

Schaap started his music career in 1974. He released four LPs and a CD. After 1982 he turned to writing and wrote several children's books and science fiction and fantasy novels. He was published in the M=SF range of the Dutch publisher Meulenhoff

Discography
Als de trein rijdt naar het westen  (1975)
Als een kameleon (1975)
Achter Atlantis (1976)
Peter Schaap (1994)

Bibliography

Children and youth books
Prinses Esmarijntje en de wensdiamant (1975)
De floepstengel (1976)
De frietmobiel (1976)
Het opmeneertje (1976)
Avontuur aan de hudsonbaai (1981)
Het gouden schip : een avontuur in het oude egypte (1986)
Het kind in de emmer en andere verhalen (1992)
De winter van de mammoet (1993)
Storm aan de witte kust (1994)
Vlucht door de vennen (1995)
Gravers (1996)
De bende van Michalis (1997)
Beeldhouwer voor de farao (2000)
Teun Palm (2008)
Emy Vels (2008)
Akan van het hunebed (2009)

Fantasy
De schrijvenaar van Thyll (1987)
Ondeeds de Loutere (1988)
De wolver (1989)
Tweesprook (1990) (kort verhaal - 1 band samen met Wim Gijsen)
Kalyndra (1990) (=Wolver deel 2)
Wolversdochter (1991) (=Wolver deel 3)
De bruiden van Tyobar (1992)
Zonen van chaos (1993)
Het woud van de maker (1999)
De vallei van de geesten (1999)
Schaduw en elfenvuur (2000) (= Schaduwmeesters deel 1)
Schaduw en dwergenstaal (2002) (= Schaduwmeesters deel 2)
Schaduw en drakenstof (2003) (= Schaduwmeesters deel 3)
Stormbreker (2008)

Prehistoric fantasy
Ogen van ivoor (1994) (Tetralogie deel 1)
Het teken van het steppenpaard (1996) (Tetralogie deel 2)
Kinderen van de aardvrouw (1996) (Tetralogie deel 3)
Het lied van de steen (1999) (Tetralogie deel 4)

References

External links
 Official website
 Profile on GoodReads.com

Dutch science fiction writers
Dutch musicians
1946 births
Living people
People from Groningen (city)